Thomas Noble Long Jr. (August 7, 1899 – July 22, 1969) was an American football player. 

Long was born in 1899 in Columbus, Ohio.  He attended Ohio State University where he studied mechanical engineering. He played as a guard for the Ohio State Buckeyes football team from 1921 to 1923 and was named to the All-Western football team.

He played professional football as a guard in the National Football League (NFL) for the Columbus Tigers in 1925. He appeared in seven NFL games, one as a starter. He also played for Jim Thorpe's Hocking Valley team of Columbus in 1927. He also played for the Columbus Tigers in 1928, though the Tigers were no longer members of the NFL that year.

Long later worked as an engineer for a gas company. He died in 1969 in Columbus.

References

1899 births
1969 deaths
Ohio State Buckeyes football players
Columbus Tigers players
Players of American football from Ohio